Pablo Calvo Hidalgo (16 March 1948 – 1 February 2000), better known as Pablito Calvo, was a Spanish child actor.

Biography
After the international success of Marcelino, pan y vino, where he won a Cannes Film Festival award (1955), he became Spain's most famous child actor. He did five more films including Mi tío Jacinto (1956) and Un ángel pasó por Brooklyn (1957), even Toto and Marcellino (1958) in Italy, with Totò.

Retired from acting at the age of 16 to become an industrial engineer later, he worked in tourism and promoting  buildings in Torrevieja. Calvo sang in a few films, but his singing voice was always dubbed on screen, in Spain by a woman, Matilde F. Vilariño.

He died on 1 February 2000 from a brain aneurysm at the age of 51.

Filmography

References

Bibliography 
 Holmstrom, John. The Moving Picture Boy: An International Encyclopaedia from 1895 to 1995, Norwich, Michael Russell, 1996, p. 264-265.

See also 
Joselito
Marisol

External links 

1948 births
2000 deaths
Male actors from Madrid
Spanish male film actors
Spanish male child actors
20th-century Spanish male actors
Neurological disease deaths in Spain
Deaths from intracranial aneurysm